Giulio Cesare Milani (c. 1621–1678) was an Italian painter of the Baroque.

He was born in Bologna, where he was a pupil of Simone Cantarini and Flaminio Torre. He painted a Marriage of the Virgin for the church of San Giuseppe; a Sant' Antonio di Padova for the church of Santa Maria del Castello; and a Holy Family with St. John for the church of the Servi.

References

17th-century Italian painters
Italian male painters
Italian Baroque painters
Painters from Bologna
1621 births
1678 deaths